SAM pointed domain-containing Ets transcription factor is a protein that in humans is encoded by the SPDEF gene.

PDEF is an ETS transcription factor expressed in prostate epithelial cells. It acts as an androgen-independent transactivator of PSA (MIM 176820) expression.[supplied by OMIM]

Interactions 

SPDEF has been shown to interact with NKX3-1.

References

Further reading